Crescent Lake is a natural lake on the eastern side of the Cascade Range in the northwest corner of Klamath County, Oregon, United States. The lake was named for its shape by Byron J. Pengra and William Holman Odell in July 1865.

Recreation
Crescent Lake is located within the Crescent Ranger District of the Deschutes National Forest.  The area has many trails for hiking, horseback riding, and mountain biking, and areas for off-road vehicles.  There are also a few developed campsites and boat ramps that provide opportunities for sailing, water skiing, camping and fishing.

Fish species found in the lake include:

Rainbow trout
Kokanee salmon
Mountain whitefish
Brown trout - non-native introduced species
Bull trout - listed as a threatened species

See also  
 List of lakes in Oregon

References

External links
Google Maps: User Content  Google Sphere 360° Photo: Crescent Lake Campground (May 2017) Image credit: Frank Bobbio - Panoramic 360 view from north end of the lake on a clear and sunny day.

Deschutes National Forest

Lakes of Oregon
Lakes of Klamath County, Oregon
Protected areas of Klamath County, Oregon
Deschutes National Forest